A pongo is a word used in the Peruvian Spanish dialect for 'canyon'. It is derived from either Quechua puncu and the Aymara ponco, meaning 'door' or 'gate.'

See:
 The Pongo de Manseriche: a gorge in northwest Peru where the Marañón River runs. The Marañón River has 35 miles of pongo before it joins the Amazon River.
 The Pongo de Mainique: the most dangerous whitewater pass on the Urubamba River.
 The Huallaga River forms the Pongo de Aguirre when crossing a part of the Andes.

Notes

References

.
.
.
Geography of Loreto Region
Landforms of Amazonas (Brazilian state)